Cranbourne East is a proposed railway station on the Cranbourne railway line in the south-eastern Melbourne suburb of Cranbourne East, Victoria, Australia. It would be the terminus of a short extension from the current Cranbourne terminus, with the station to be located west of Reynard Place and north of the Blue Hills retirement village, and adjacent to near the Casey Fields sporting complex.  There is a proposed pedestrian underpass to be built along with the station.

The station was promised by the Australian Labor Party during the 1999 and 2002 state election campaigns, but was dumped in May 2006. In November 2003, a "Trainlink" bus service was introduced as an alternative, meeting each train at Cranbourne station and running on a largely one-way loop through Cranbourne East. The then state government's Victorian Transport Plan, released in  December 2008, listed the station and associated rail extension as "medium term" project, which was estimated to cost $200 million.

In January 2018, City of Casey advised it would need almost $3 Billion worth of rail and road infrastructure to extend the metropolitan train from Cranbourne to Clyde with duplication of the line between Dandenong and Cranbourne.

References

Proposed railway stations in Melbourne